The 1946 South Carolina Gamecocks football team was an American football team that represented the University of South Carolina as a member of the Southern Conference (SoCon) during the 1946 college football season. In their sixth season under head coach Rex Enright,  the Gamecocks compiled an overall record of 5–3 with a mark of 4–2 in conference play, placing fourth in the SoCon. The team was outscored by a total of 133 to 107 on the season. 

The team ranked fourth nationally in rushing defense, allowing an average of only 79.6 rushing yards per game. The Gamecocks struggled offensively, ranking 79th out of 120 major-college teams in scoring offense with an average of 13.4 point per game.

Center Bryant Meeks received first-team honors from the Associated Press (AP) and United Press (UP) on the 1946 All-Southern Conference football team. He also received second-team honors from the AP on the 1946 All-America college football team. Other Gamecocks receiving all-conference honor were backs Harold Hagan (AP-3, UP-2) and Earl Dunham (UP-3) and tackle Dom Fusci (AP-3, UP-2).

Schedule

After the season

The 1947 NFL Draft was held on December 16, 1946. The following Gamecocks players were selected.

References

South Carolina
South Carolina Gamecocks football seasons
South Carolina Gamecocks football